Mohamed Gahs (born 30 September 1963, Taza) is a Moroccan journalist and politician of the Socialist Union of Popular Forces party. He held the position of Secretary of State for the Youth in the cabinet of Driss Jettou (2002–2007). Between 1993 and 2005, he was editor-in-chief of "Libération", the newspaper of the USFP.

See also
Cabinet of Morocco

References

Government ministers of Morocco
1963 births
Living people
People from Taza
Moroccan editors
Moroccan male journalists
Socialist Union of Popular Forces politicians